Marc Hyman is an American screenwriter. His writing credits include Universal's Meet the Fockers, Paramount's The Perfect Score, Warner Bros.'s Osmosis Jones, and Open Road Films' Show Dogs. He has served as a script doctor for more than 40 produced films.

Career
Hyman began his career writing for television series, All That, Sweet Valley High and the short lived Fox sit-com, Lush Life. He then moved to features writing Warner Bros. live-action/animated Osmosis Jones Hyman later developed the film's spin-off Ozzy & Drix.

Hyman worked with Jay Roach to develop Meet the Fockers which was, in 2005, the highest grossing comedy of all time.

In addition to Hyman's credited work, he has rewritten scripts for more than 40 produced films, including DreamWorks Animation's How to Train Your Dragon, Madagascar 3: Europe's Most Wanted, Penguins of Madagascar, and cult hits like Freddy Got Fingered and Disney's Bubble Boy. Over his career, Hyman has contributed comedy to dozens of films including, Dodgeball: A True Underdog Story, Freaky Friday, Monsters vs. Aliens and Shrek. In television, Hyman has written pilots for ABC, Fox, CBS and FX including vehicles for Kelsey Grammer, Matthew McConaughey (both for the FX Network) and with Julia Roberts for ABC.

Rewrites and polishes
 Rock Star (Warner Bros.)
 Me, Myself & Irene (Fox)
 The Smurfs (Sony)
 Charlotte's Web (Paramount)
 The Ringer (Fox)
 Showtime (Warner Bros.)
 Say It Isn't So (Fox)
 Rush Hour (New Line)
 Shanghai Noon (Touchstone)
 Wild Wild West (Warner Bros.)
 Shrek (DreamWorks) 
 First Daughter (New Regency) 
 Glory Road (Disney) 
 How to Train Your Dragon (DreamWorks) 
 Madagascar 3: Europe's Most Wanted (DreamWorks) 
 Penguins of Madagascar (DreamWorks) 
 Monsters vs. Aliens (DreamWorks) 
 The Ant Bully (Warner Bros.)
 Movie 43 (Relativity)
 Agent Cody Banks 2: Destination London (MGM)
 Kangaroo Jack (Warner Bros.)
 Freddy Got Fingered (New Regency)
 Bubble Boy (Disney)
 DodgeBall: A True Underdog Story (Fox)
 Last Holliday (Paramount)
 Joe Somebody (New Regency)
 Dr. Dolittle 2 (Fox)
 Just My Luck (New Regency)
 Freaky Friday (Disney)
 Ghosts of Girlfriends Past (New Line)
 The Secret Life of Walter Mitty (Paramount)
 Ghostbusters (Sony)
 Yours, Mine & Ours (Sony)
 Transformers (Paramount)
 The Great Wall (Legendary)

References

External links
 

Living people
Year of birth missing (living people)
People from Los Angeles
Screenwriters from California
American male screenwriters
American television writers
American male television writers
21st-century American male writers
21st-century American screenwriters